François Dyrek (16 August 1933 – 17 December 1999) was a French actor. He appeared in more than 140 films and television shows between 1964 and 1999.

Partial filmography

 L'assassin viendra ce soir (1964) - Un membre du gang des pompes funèbres
 La baie du désir (1964) - Le braconnier
 Drôle de jeu (1968) - Le second clandestin (Serge)
 La Bande à Bonnot (1968) - Édouard Carouy
 Ho! (1968) - Le typographe (uncredited)
 L'amour c'est gai, l'amour c'est triste (1971)
 Les galets d'Étretat (1972)
 Themroc (1973) - Un policier
 Night Flight from Moscow (1973) - - Taxi driver (uncredited)
 L'emmerdeur (1973)
 Projection privée (1973) - L'autre metteur en scène
 Piaf (1974) - Henri
 Let Joy Reign Supreme (1975) - Montlouis
 The Judge and the Assassin (1976) - Released Tramp
 I Am Pierre Riviere (1976) - L'homme de la battue
 Les Ambassadeurs (1976) - Paul
 Le Juge Fayard dit Le Shériff (1977) - José Bouvine - un truand
 La Question (1977) - Lieutenant Herbelin
 Monsieur Papa (1977)
 Vous n'aurez pas l'Alsace et la Lorraine (1977) - Le second tavernier
 Le Crabe-tambour (1977) - Le cafetier-gendarme
 L'exercice du pouvoir (1978)
 Si vous n'aimez pas ça, n'en dégoûtez pas les autres (1978) - Un spectateur
 Vas-y maman (1978) - Le routier
 Un balcon en forêt (1978)
 M58, la magnitude du bout du monde (1978)
 Coup de tête (1979) - Le chauffeur du premier camion
 Tendrement vache (1979) - Andre Legent
 Le divorcement (1979) - Julien
 Le mors aux dents (1979) - Guy Pasquier
 Écoute voir (1979) - Inspecteur Daloup
 Tout dépend des filles... (1980) - Good Night, l'aveugle
 La Petite Sirène (1980) - Un ami de Georges
 Asphalte (1981) - Edward
 Le chêne d'Allouville (1981) - Roger Dubois, l'adjoint au maire
 Julien Fontanes, magistrat (1981, TV Series) - Marcellin
 La vie continue (1981) - Robert
 Le jardinier (1981) - The Thief of Water
 Parti sans laisser d'adresse (1982) - L'inspecteur
 Le corbillard de Jules (1982) - Le capitaine
 Paradis pour tous (1982) - Le responsable du zoo
 Équateur (1983) - Superintendent
 Le voleur de feuilles (1983) - Jacky
 Les Rois du gag (1985) - L'épicier
 Le gaffeur (1985) - Marcel Dugrand
 Flagrant désir (1986) - Georges Barnac
 Noyade interdite (1987) - Bernard
 Tant pis si je meurs (1987) - Garfunkel
 Radio Corbeau (1989) - Albert Cauvin - le cafetier
 Torquemada (1989)
 Life and Nothing But (1989) - Vergnes
 La fracture du myocarde (1990) - Titanic
 A Day to Remember (1991) - Jean
 La tribu (1991) - Le chauffeur du camion
 Le coup suprême (1991) - L'homme-ours
 Le Zèbre (1992) - Alphonse
 La braconne (1993) - René
 Inner City (1995) - DD, le père
 Tempête dans un verre d'eau (1997) - Socrate
 Le margouillat (2000) - Le beau-père

References

External links

1933 births
1999 deaths
People from Pontoise
French male film actors
French male television actors
20th-century French male actors